Masetto can mean the following:
 Masetto, character in  Don Giovanni
 Franco Masetto, Italian football player